Alisha Rebecca Glass Childress  (born April 5, 1988) is an American former professional volleyball player who played as a setter for the United States women's national volleyball team. Glass played collegiate volleyball for Penn State, where she led Penn State to three NCAA consecutive championships. Glass won gold with the national team at the 2014 World Championship, and bronze at the 2015 World Cup and 2016 Rio Olympic Games.

Career

High school
Glass played high school volleyball for Leland High School in Michigan, where her mother Laurie Glass was also her coach and grandfather Larry Glass was her high school basketball coach. She was a four-time first team all-state, all-region dream team and all-conference, is the National and State High School record holder in season aces (296), career aces (937) and career kills (3,584) and during scholastic career attacked at a .440 clip while also contributing 1,816 digs and 680 blocks. She was named Michigan Gatorade High School Player of the Year and Miss Volleyball for the state of Michigan.

College
She played college women's volleyball at Penn State University. During her four years at Penn State, the Nittany Lions posted a stunning 142-5 record (.966), including a perfect 102-0 streak that spanned three seasons, captured the 2007, 2008 and 2009 NCAA titles, advanced to the 2006 Elite Eight and won four Big Ten Conference titles. She was the three-time All-American, first team All-Big Ten, and three-time First Team AVCA All-Mideast Region. Under her guidance, Glass directed the Penn State offense to a record setting and nation-leading .390 hitting percentage and the Nittany Lions bested their own record of .350 set in 2007. She finished her career in 13th place in hitting percentage with .336 and blocks with 448, fourth in assists with 5,800, and fifteen with 465 sets played.

International
Glass won the gold medal at the 2014 World Championship when her national team defeated 3–1 to China. She was also selected tournament's Best Setter. Glass has played for the United States women's national volleyball team in Rio that won a bronze medal and was named Best Setter.

Clubs
 Penn State University (2006–2009)
 Vôlei Futuro (2010–2011)
 Atom Trefl Sopot (2011–2012)
 LIU•JO Volley Modena (2012–2013)
 Fenerbahçe (2013–2014)
 Imoco Volley Conegliano (2014–2016)
 Athletes Unlimited (2022)

Coaching

Glass Childress joined the Stanford women's volleyball coaching staff as an assistant coach in January 2019. She left after 2 seasons.

Awards

Individual
 2013 World Grand Prix "Best Setter"
 2013 NORCECA Championship "Best Setter"
 2014 FIVB World Championship "Best Setter"
 2016 Olympic Games "Best Setter"

National team
 2011  Pan-American Volleyball Cup 		
 2011  Women's NORCECA Volleyball Continental Championship
 2011  FIVB World Grand Prix
 2011  FIVB Women's World Cup
 2012  Pan-American Volleyball Cup 		
 2012  FIVB World Grand Prix
 2013  Pan-American Volleyball Cup 	
 2013  NORCECA Championship 	
 2013  FIVB World Grand Champions Cup	
 2014  FIVB World Championship 	
 2015  FIVB World Grand Prix	
 2015  FIVB Women's World Cup
 2015  Women's NORCECA Volleyball Continental Championship
 2016  Women's NORCECA Olympic Qualification Tournament
 2016  FIVB World Grand Prix
 2016  Summer Olympics

College
 2x First Team AVCA All-American (2008, 2009)
 Second Team AVCA All-American (2007)
 3x NCAA Championship All-Tournament Team (2007, 2008, 2009)
 2x NCAA Regional All-Tournament Team ( 2008, 2009)
 3x AVCA National Player of the Week  (11/11/06, 11/19/07, 11/18/08)
 Three-time First Team All-Big Ten (2007, 2008, 2009)
 2006 Big Ten All-Freshman Team 
 Four-time Big Ten Player of the Week

See also
List of Pennsylvania State University Olympians

References

External links
 
 
 
 
 Alisha Glass and Fenerbahce (istasy10.net)

1988 births
Living people
American women's volleyball players
Fenerbahçe volleyballers
Penn State Nittany Lions women's volleyball players
People from Leland, Michigan
Setters (volleyball)
Volleyball players at the 2016 Summer Olympics
Olympic bronze medalists for the United States in volleyball
Medalists at the 2016 Summer Olympics
African-American volleyball players
Expatriate volleyball players in Italy
Expatriate volleyball players in Poland
Expatriate volleyball players in Turkey
American expatriate sportspeople in Brazil
American expatriate sportspeople in Italy
American expatriate sportspeople in Poland
American expatriate sportspeople in Turkey
Expatriate volleyball players in Brazil
American volleyball coaches
Stanford Cardinal women's volleyball coaches
21st-century African-American sportspeople
21st-century African-American women
20th-century African-American people
20th-century African-American women